The 2010 Challenger of Dallas was a professional tennis tournament played on indoor hard courts. It was part of the 2010 ATP Challenger Tour. It took place in Dallas, United States, between 1 and 6 February 2010.

ATP entrants

Seeds

 Rankings are as of January 18, 2010

Other entrants
The following players received wildcards into the singles main draw:
  Ryan Harrison
  Michael McClune
  Bobby Reynolds
  Dane Webb

The following players received entry from the qualifying draw:
  Luka Gregorc
  Jean-Noel Insausti
  Nicholas Monroe
  Juho Paukku

Champions

Singles

 Ryan Sweeting def.  Carsten Ball, 6–4, 6–2

Doubles

 Scott Lipsky /  David Martin def.  Vasek Pospisil /  Adyl Shamasdin, 7–6(9–7), 6–3

External links

Challenger of Dallas
Tennis tournaments in the United States
Challenger of Dallas
Challenger
Challenger of Dallas
Challenger of Dallas